is a railway station in the city of Akita, Akita Prefecture,  Japan, operated by JR East.

Lines

Station layout
The station has one island platform connected to the station building by an underground passage The station is staffed and has a Midori no Madoguchi staffed ticket office.

Platforms

History
Ugo-Ushijima Station opened on July 31, 1921 as a station on the Japanese Government Railways (JGR) Rikuusai Line, serving the town of Ushijima, Akita. It was switched to the control of the JGR Uetsu Main Line on April 20, 1924. The current station building was completed in June 1944. The JGR became the JNR (Japan National Railway) after World War II. With the privatization of the JNR on April 1, 1987, the station came under the joint control of the East Japan Railway Company and the Japan Freight Railway Company. All freight operations were suspended after April 1, 2006.

Passenger statistics
In fiscal 2018, the station was used by an average of 760 passengers daily (boarding passengers only). The passenger figures for previous years are as shown below.

Surrounding area
 
Akita Minami High School
Ushijima Elementary School

See also
List of railway stations in Japan

References

External links

 JR East Station information 

Railway stations in Japan opened in 1920
Railway stations in Akita Prefecture
Uetsu Main Line
Buildings and structures in Akita (city)